Valentin Götzinger (born 12 December 2000) is an Austrian racing cyclist, who currently rides for UCI Continental team . In August 2020, he won the Austrian National Road Race Championships.

Major results
2018
 3rd Time trial, National Junior Road Championships
2019
 3rd Time trial, National Under-23 Road Championships
2020
 1st  Road race, National Road Championships
 8th GP Kranj

References

External links
 

2000 births
Living people
Austrian male cyclists
People from Graz-Umgebung District
European Games competitors for Austria
Cyclists at the 2019 European Games
Sportspeople from Styria
21st-century Austrian people